Stan or Stanley Cohen may refer to:

 Stanley Cohen (biochemist) (1922–2020), American Nobel Prize Laureate in Physiology and Medicine
 Stan Cohen (politician) (1927–2004), British Labour politician
 Stanley Cohen (physicist) (1927–2017), founder and president of Speakeasy Computing Corporation
 Stanley Cohen (sociologist) (1942–2013), Martin White Professor of Sociology at the London School of Economics
 Stanley Norman Cohen (born 1935), American geneticist
 Stanley G. Cohen, president of Five Towns College
 Stanley Cohen (attorney) (born 1953), attorney and human rights advocate